Arthur Frederick Goodrich (February 18, 1878 – June 26, 1941) was an American novelist and playwright who was prominent on Broadway during the 1920s and 1930s. He wrote a mixture of crime and comedy plays. One of his greatest hits was the 1922 Anglo-American culture clash comedy So This Is London, which was turned into films twice. He wrote the libretto for an opera version of Caponsacchi.

Selected works

Novels
 The Balance of Power (1906)

Plays
 Yes or No (1917) — filmed as Yes or No? (1919)
 So This Is London (1922) — filmed in 1930 and 1939
 The Joker (1925)
 The Plutocrat (1930)
 The Perfect Marriage (1932)
 A Journey by Night (1935)

References

Sources
 Bordman, Gerald Martin. American Theatre: A Chronicle of Comedy and Drama, 1914-1930. Oxford University Press, 1995.
 Kabatchnik, Amnon. Blood on the Stage, 1925-1950: Milestone Plays of Crime, Mystery and Detection. Scarecrow Press, 2010.

1878 births
1941 deaths
American male dramatists and playwrights
American opera librettists
Novelists from Connecticut
Writers from New Britain, Connecticut
20th-century American dramatists and playwrights
20th-century American novelists
20th-century American male writers
Members of the American Academy of Arts and Letters